Reuf Herco (born 16 July 1964 in Breza, SFR Yugoslavia  ) is a retired Bosnian-Herzegovinian professional footballer.

Club career
Herco played the position of forward for Rudar Breza, FK Sarajevo and Unis Vogošća.

Personal life
After retiring from professional football he established a private football academy in his hometown. Furthermore, he is a board member of Rudar Breza.

References

1964 births
Living people
People from Breza, Bosnia and Herzegovina
Association football forwards
Bosnia and Herzegovina footballers
FK Sarajevo players
Premier League of Bosnia and Herzegovina players